The Hochdonn High Bridge (Hochbrücke Hochdonn in German) is a railway bridge in the Marsh Railway crossing the Kiel Canal near Hochdonn, Germany. It is a riveted steel bridge, "exposed to extreme railway traffic".

History
The rail bridge was opened on 11 June 1920.

The central part of the main span suffered from general deterioration, but damage caused by two ship collisions made it necessary to substitute a new center part. Once removed, the steel structure was lowered onto a transport barge. The new structure that arrived the night before on another transport barge was lifted into place. While lowering and lifting work was going on, this section of the canal was closed and a large number of ships were waiting to pass; the alternative was to navigate around the northern tip of Denmark. 

See also
 Kiel Canal

Gallery

References

Railway bridges in Germany
Buildings and structures in Schleswig-Holstein
Bridges completed in 1913
Kiel Canal